Azania may refer to:

Places
 Azania, a historical region in East Africa
 Azania (Greece), a historical region of ancient Arcadia, Greece
 Azania (Somalia), an autonomous region in southern Somalia; incumbent name of the former Jubaland region
 Azania, a microcontinent that consisted of parts of modern Madagascar, East Africa, Arabia and south India
 Azania, proposed name for South Africa
 Azania, rejected name for South Sudan
 Azania, a new name for the Central African Republic

Fiction
 Azania, a fictional island in Evelyn Waugh's novel Black Mischief
 Azania, a black-ruled South Africa extending far northwards in Bruce Sterling's novel Islands in the Net
 Azania, a new name for South Africa in Kim Stanley Robinson's Mars trilogy of novels
 Azania, a province in the novels Lion's Blood and Zulu Heart by Steven Barnes

People
 Malcolm Azania (born 1969), Canadian teacher, writer, community activist
 Azania Stewart (born 1989), British basketball player

Other uses
 Azania Bank, a commercial bank in Tanzania
 Azania: Archaeological Research in Africa, the peer-reviewed journal of the British Institute in Eastern Africa
 "Azania (Soon Come)", a song by New Zealand reggae group Herbs

See also
 Pan Africanist Congress of Azania, a South African liberation movement
 Socialist Party of Azania, a Trotskyist, pan-Africanist political party in South Africa
 Azania Liberation Front, an armed faction in the First Sudanese Civil War